The Hall Cemetery is a small rural cemetery in Canberra, the capital of Australia. It is located in Wallaroo Road, Hall, Australian Capital Territory.

The Cemetery contains some rare and endangered plants, such as the Tarengo leek orchid.

Notable burials
 Bryce Courtenay AM

References

External links
 

Cemeteries in the Australian Capital Territory